R.S.A Garcia is a Trinidadian science fiction writer.

Life and career
R.S.A Garcia is from Trinidad where she lives and works. In 2015 she won the Independent Publishers Book Awards Silver Medal for Best Scifi/Fantasy/Horror Ebook. She has written both novels and short stories published in international magazines.

Bibliography 

 Douen Mother ( Abyss and Apex Magazine as R.S. Garcia )
 Lex Talionis ( Dragonwell – 2014)
 The Bois  ( Truancy Magazine )
 The Anchorite Wakes ( Clarkesworld Magazine )
 The Sun from Both Sides ( Clarkesworld Magazine )
 Fire In His Eyes, Blood On His Teeth  ( Devil's Ways )
 Philia, Eros, Storge, Agàpe, Pragma ( Clarkesworld Magazine)

References 

Caribbean women writers
Living people
Science fiction writers
Year of birth missing (living people)